With 280,000 members, it is not surprising that the SV Dynamo multi-sport club has won 2.187 championships in the GDR, so that a separate category should be needed.

List

Acrobatics (Zircus)

The acrobats won 13 titles. 
Ladies: 1980, 1976, 1970
Group ladies: 1980, 1981, 1982, 1985
Mixed ladies: 1980, 1981, 1982
Gentlemen: 1975
Pair gentlemen: 1980
Group gentlemen: 1965

Artistic roller skating

The roller skaters won 2 titles.
Gentlemen: 1956
Artistic roller skating (Dancing) ladies:  1956

Athletics (track and field) men

The men won over 212 championships in athletics (track and field).
1500 metres: 1967
5000 metres: 1988
100 metres: 1969, 1973, 1988, 1989
200 metres: 1969, 1973, 1974
400 metres: 1953, 1954, 1957, 1958, 1960, 1961, 1962, 1963, 1964, 1965, 1977
Racewalking 25000 metres: 1954, 1955
110 metre hurdles: 1962, 1963, 1964, 1965, 1987
200 metre hurdles: 1965
400 metre hurdles: 1960, 1968,
Steeplechase (athletics) 3000m: 1982, 1984
4 × 100 metres relay: 1949, 1952, 1969, 1972, 1973, 1980, 1982, 1984, 1989
4 × 200 metres relay: 1968
Racewalking 20 km team: 1955, 1956, 1958, 1962
Racewalking 10 km: 1953
Racewalking 20 km: 1955, 1962, 1967, 1972, 1977, 1978, 1982
Racewalking 25 km team: 1954
Racewalking 35 km: 1964, 1965
Racewalking 35 km team: 1964
Racewalking 50 km men: 1952, 1954, 1955, 1956, 1957, 1958, 1960, 1963, 1964, 1965, 1966, 1967, 1967, 1968, 1969, 1970, 1973, 1975, 1976
Racewalking 50 km team: 1951, 1952, 1953, 1954, 1955, 1956, 1957, 1958, 1959, 1960, 1962, 1963, 1964, 1965
Marathon: 1955, 1971, 1977, 1988
Marathon team: 1955, 1956, 1957, 1963
High jump: 1967, 1968
Pole vault: 1984, 1985
Long jump: 1951, 1960, 1961, 1962, 1964, 1967, 1968, 1969, 1970, 1981, 1982, 1986, 1987, 1988, 1989
Triple jump: 1957, 1960, 1964, 1968, 1973, 1987, 1990
Shot put: 1969, 1970, 1971, 1972, 1973, 1974, 1975, 1976
Discus throw: 1967, 1970, 1972, 1975, 1976, 1977, 1978, 1979, 1980
Javelin throw: 1961, 1962
Hammer throw: 1985
4 × 800 metres relay: 1966
Cross 7 km: 1976, 1981, 1983, 1987
Cross 12 km: 1988
Heptathlon modern single: 1965, 1966, 1967, 1968

Athletics (track and field) at the gym

60m : 1988
400 metres : 1964, 1965, 1971, 1989
800 metres : 1967, 1983, 1984
1500 metres : 1982, 1983, 1984
3000 metres : 1982, 1988
5000 metres : 1984, 1985, 1986
4x2 Rounds: 1964, 1973
4 × 400 metres relay: 1964
Racewalking 20 km: 1976, 1982
60 metres hurdling 20 km: 1964, 1965, 1987, 1988
High jump: 1964, 1969
Pole vault: 1967, 1968, 1984, 1985, 1986, 1987, 1988
Long jump:  1965, 1966, 1967, 1968, 1969, 1970, 1978, 1987, 1988
Triple jump: 1964, 1968, 1973, 1981
Shot put: 1967, 1969, 1970, 1971, 1972, 1973, 1974, 1976
Octathlon: 1975

Athletics (track and field) ladies
The ladies won over 196 titles.
100 metres: 1953, 1954, 1956, 1957, 1958, 1959, 1960, 1966
200 metres: 1953, 1954, 1956, 1957, 1958, 1959, 1960, 1966, 1967
400 metres: 1958, 1959, 1961, 1962, 1970, 1972, 1973, 1979
800 metres: 1968
1500 metres: 1981, 1988
3000 metres: 1987, 1988, 1989, 1990
10000 metres: 1987, 1988, 1989, 1990
80 metres hurdles: 1948 1956, 1957, 1958, 1959, 1960, 1961
100 metres hurdles: 1967, 1968, 1984, 1986, 1988, 1989
400 metres hurdles: 1989
Racewalking: 10 km 1986
4 × 100 metres relay: 1956, 1957, 1958, 1959, 1960, 1961, 1962, 1963, 1964, 1965
4 × 200 metres relay: 1961, 1962, 1963, 1964, 1965, 1966, 1967
4 × 400 metres relay: 1969, 1972, 1975, 1976
High jump: 1978, 1983, 1985, 1987
Long jump: 1954, 1956, 1960, 1961, 1962, 1964, 1977
Shot put: 1952, 1953, 1974, 1975, 1976, 1977, 1979, 1980, 1981, 1982, 1983, 1984, 1987, 1989, 1990
Javelin throw: 1957, 1958, 1959, 1974
Heptathlon: 1956, 1957, 1960, 1961, 1985
80 metres hurdles: 1948, 1950, 1952, 1956, 1957, 1958, 1959, 1959, 1960, 1961
100 metres hurdles: 1967, 1968, 1984, 1985, 1986, 1988, 1989
400 metres hurdles: 1981, 1982, 1983, 1989
Cross 3 km team: 1964

Athletics (track and field) at the gym
60 metres: 1966, 1968, 1969, 1976
100 metres: 1976
400 metres: 1966, 1967, 1968, 1969, 1971, 1972
800 metres: 1968, 1977, 1983
1500 metres: 1971, 1974, 1981, 1983, 1988
3000 metres: 1981, 1982, 1983, 1984, 1988, 1989
60 metres hurdles: 1984, 1985, 1986, 1987, 1988, 1989
4x 1 Round: 1964, 1965, 1966, 1967, 1968, 1973
High jump: 1966, 1978, 1984, 1987
Long jump: 1980, 1989
Shot put: 1972, 1974, 1975, 1976, 1977, 1979, 1980, 1981, 1985, 1986, 1987, 1989
Heptathlon: 1985, 1987

Biathlon
Biathletes won 45 titles.
Biathlon (20km) single men: 1960, 1961, 1963, 1964, 1968, 1969, 1970, 1971, 1974, 1977, 1978, 1979, 1980, 1985, 1987, 1988
Biathlon (10km) single men: 1977, 1978, 1980, 1983, 1985, 1987, 1989
Biathlon 4x 7,5km relay men:' 1965, 1967, 1968, 1969, 1970, 1971, 1974, 1957, 1976, 1977, 1978, 1979, 1980, 1983, 1984, 1985, 1986, 1988, 1989
Biathlon club women and men: 1960, 1963, 1964

Bobsleigh
Bobsleighers won a single title.
Duo: 1956

Boxing
Boxers won 71 titles.
Super Flyweight men: 1967
Flyweight men: 1956, 1957, 1970, 1971, 1972, 1980, 1981, 1982
Featherweight men: 1949, 1950, 1953, 1955, 1956, 1965
Lightweight men: 1956, 1958, 1960
Half Welterweight men: 1958, 1966, 1967, 1968, 1969, 1970, 1978, 1987
Welterweight men: 1979
Light heavyweight men: 1961, 1962, 1972, 1974, 1975, 1980
Middleweight men: 1956, 1965, 1967, 1972, 1973, 1974, 1975, 1976
Light heavyweight men: 1951, 1954, 1961, 1962, 1963
Heavyweight men: 1954, 1961, 1962, 1963, 1979
Super Heavyweight men: 1989
Club:' 1966, 1967, 1968
Light flyweight men: 1967
Flyweight men: 1956, 1970, 1971, 1972
Bantamweight men: 1956, 1958, 1959, 1961, 1963, 1964, 1966, 1982, 1983, 1984, 1985

Cross-country skiing
The cross-county skiers won 90 titles. 
Cross-country skiing 5 km ladies: 1971, 1978
Cross-country skiing 10 km ladies: 1955, 1956, 1957, 1958, 1959, 1962, 1964, 1967, 1969, 1970, 1971, 1972, 1978
Cross-country skiing 30 km ladies: 1985
Cross-country skiing 4 x 5 km relay ladies: 1956, 1958, 1959, 1960, 1962, 1965, 1970, 1971,
Cross-country skiing 10 km team ladies: 1969, 1970
Cross-country skiing 15 km gentlemen: 1959, 1962, 1963, 1964, 1965, 1968, 1973, 1976, 1977, 1978, 1980, 1981, 1982, 1983, 1984, 1985
Cross-country skiing 30 km gentlemen: 1961, 1962, 1963, 1964, 1966, 1968, 1969, 1973, 1976, 1977, 1979, 1980, 1982, 1984
Cross-country skiing 50 km gentlemen: 1958, 1959, 1962, 1966, 1969, 1972, 1975, 1976, 1977, 1982, 1983, 1984, 1987, 1989
Cross-country skiing 4 x 10 km relay gentlemen: 1960, 1961, 1962, 1963, 1964, 1966, 1967, 1968, 1969, 1971, 1974, 1975, 1976, 1977, 1978, 1979, 1980, 1981, 1982, 1984
Cross-country skiing 15 km team gentlemen: 1969, 1970

Cycling
Cyclists won 53 titles.
Madison (cycling) men: 1960, 1964, 1968, 1970, 1971, 1972
Miss and Out men: 1963, 1967, 1968, 1969, 1982, 1983, 1986, 1987, 1988
Team pursuit men: 1955, 1956, 1957, 1959, 1967, 1968, 1970, 1981
Track cycling ladies 3000 m: 1984
Points race men: 1989
Individual pursuit women 1959, 
Sprint cycling women 1960, 1961 
Sprint (cycling) men: 1976, 1977, 1989
Individual pursuit men: 1960, 1964, 1968,  1970, 1972
Track time trial men 1000 m: 1979
Individual pursuit men 4000 m: 1987

Individual pursuit ladies 3000 m: 1984
Team pursuit men 4000 m: 1981
Tandem men: 1956, 1957, 1968, 1969, 1970, 1971
Track time trial men: 1970
Road bicycle racing team men 100 km: 1961, 1962, 1963, 1964, 1970
Criterium men: 1970, 1977, 1979

Fencing
Fencers won 106 titles.
Foil (fencing) single men: 1966, 1967, 1968, 1968, 1969, 1970, 1971, 1976, 1979
Foil (fencing) team men: 1969, 1978, 1981, 1982
Épée single men: 1961, 1964, 1966, 1967, 1970, 1971, 1974, 1975, 1976
Épée team men: 1959, 1969, 1974, 1975, 1979, 1980
Sabre (fencing) single men:' 1960, 1962, 1966, 1967, 1968, 1969, 1970, 1971, 1972, 1973, 1975, 1978, 1980, 1982, 1984, 1985, 1986, 1987
Sabre (fencing) team men:' 1968, 1969, 1973, 1974, 1975, 1976, 1977, 1978, 1979, 1980, 1981, 1982
Foil (fencing) single ladies: 1960, 1961, 1966, 1978, 1982, 1983, 1984, 1985, 1987, 1988, 1990
Foil (fencing) team ladies: 1958, 1959, 1975, 1977, 1972, 1982

Figure skating
Figure skaters won 31 titles.
Single skating men: 1960, 1961, 1962, 1963, 1964, 1965, 1966, 1988
Single skating ladies: 1960, 1974, 1975
Pair skating: 1962, 1964, 1965, 1966, 1967, 1968, 1969, 1970, 1971, 1972, 1973, 1974, 1975, 1976, 1981, 1985, 1986, 1987
Ice dancing: 1990

Gymnastics
Gymnasts won 110 titles.

Ladies
Single: 1967, 1969, 1970, 1971, 1972, 1973, 1974, 1978, 1979, 1980, 1981, 1982, 1983, 1984, 1985, 1987, 1988
Vault: 1958, 1959, 1960, 1963, 1964, 1968, 1970, 1971, 1979, 1972, 1972, 1982, 1985, 1988
Uneven bars: 1958, 1960, 1962, 1964, 1965, 1966, 1967, 1968, 1969, 1970, 1971, 1973, 1979, 1981, 1982, 1983, 1984, 1987, 1988
Balance beam: 1958,1959, 1960, 1961, 1962, 1963, 1969, 1972, 1979, 1980, 1982, 1983, 1985, 1988
Floor: 1958, 1959, 1962, 1963, 1965, 1966, 1969, 1970, 1971, 1972, 1974, 1977, 1979, 1981, 1982, 1984, 1985, 1988

Gentlemen
All: 1976, 1977, 1978, 1979, 1980, 1981
Vault : 1975, 1977, 1979, 1980
Pommel horse : 1976, 1977, 1978, 1979, 1980, 1982, 1985, 1986
Floor : 1975, 1976, 1977, 1978, 1979, 1980, 1981, 1982, 1983, 1984, 1985
Parallel bars : 1977, 1981
Rings : 1971, 1980
Horizontal bar: 1979, 1980, 1981, 1982, 1988

Handball
Handball teams won 9 titles.
Gentlemen: 1951, 1952, 1967, 1969, 1971
Gentlemen field: 1956, 1957, 1961, 1966

Ice hockey
The ice hockey teams won 38 titles in the smallest ice hockey league in the world. When the SC Dynamo Berlin was the champion, the SG Dynamo Weißwasser won the vice titles and when the SG Dynamo Weißwasser won the titles, the SC Dynamo Berlin won the vice medal.
Men: 1953,1954 1955, 1956, 1957, 1958, 1959, 1960, 1961, 1962, 1963, 1964, 1965, 1966, 1967, 1968, 1969, 1970, 1971, 1972, 1973, 1974, 1975, 1976, 1977, 1978, 1979, 1980, 1981, 1982, 1983, 1984, 1985, 1986, 1987, 1988, 1989, 1990

Judo
Judokas won 30 titles.
Featherweight ladies: 1979, 1984, 1986, 1987, 1988
Lightweight 52 kg ladies: 1969, 1970, 1972, 1975, 1976, 1977, 1978, 1979
Halfmiddleweight 56 kg ladies: 1966, 1967, 1968, 1969, 1970, 1971, 1978, 1980, 1981
Middleweight 61 kg ladies: 1966, 1967, 1968, 1969, 1970, 1978, 1980, 1981

Motorsport 
The athletes of motorsport won 74 titles.
Enduro Grasstrack 55ccm: 1964, 1965, 1972, 1973, 1974, 1975, 1976, 1977, 1978, 1979
Enduro Grasstrack 75ccm: 1975, 1976, 1977, 1978, 1979, 1980, 1981, 1982, 1983, 1984, 1985
Enduro Grasstrack 125ccm: 1958
Enduro Grasstrack 175ccm: 1972, 1973
Motorcycle speedway single: 1967
Motorcycle speedway team: 1969, 1970, 1971,
Motocross 125 ccm: 1961, 1962, 1964, 1965, 1966, 1967, 1968, 1970, 1973, 1976, 1977, 1980, 1989
Motocross 175 ccm: 1961, 1963, 1964, 1965, 1966
Motocross 250 ccm: 1962, 1964, 1965, 1967, 1968, 1969, 1970, 1971, 1972, 1973, 1976, 1977, 1978
Motocross 350 ccm: 1962
Motoball team: 1978, 1979, 1980, 1981, 1982, 1983, 1984, 1985, 1986, 1987, 1988, 1989
Touring car racing Class 13 (over 1000 ccm): 1972
Formula Three/Class C9/Class B8 /E until 1300 ccm: 1977

Orienteering 
Orienteerers won 36 titles.
Orienteering men: 1965, 1966, 1967, 1968, 1974, 1975, 1976, 1980, 1981
Orienteering men relay: 1965, 1968, 1972, 1973, 1975
Orienteering ladies: 1964, 1977, 1983
Orienteering ladies relay: 1964, 1965, 1966, 1977, 1978, 1981, 1982, 1983
Orienteering men long distance: 1979
Orienteering ladies night: 1979, 1980
Ski orienteering men: 1957, 1961, 1964, 1965
Ski orienteering ladies: 1969, 1970
Ski orienteering men relay: 1970

Parachuting

Parachuters (women) won 64 titles.
Alone: 1965, 1969, 1970, 1972, 1973, 1974, 1975, 1977, 1979, 1981, 1982, 1983, 1984, 1987, 1988
Figure Jumping: 1963, 1969, 1972, 1973, 1974, 1975, 1976, 1976, 1977, 1979, 1981, 1982, 1985, 1986, 1987
Portfolio: 1963, 1967, 1969, 1970, 1972, 1973, 1974, 1975, 1976, 1977, 1979, 1981, 1982, 1985, 1987
Team: 1970, 1973, 1974, 1975, 1979, 1981, 1982, 1983, 1984, 1985, 1987
Team competition: 1969, 1977, 1978, 1979, 1981, 1982, 1985, 1987
Parachuters (men) won 57 titles.
Alone : 1963, 1965, 1965, 1969, 1971, 1972, 1973, 1978, 1981, 1982, 1983, 1984, 1985, 1987, 1988
Team: 1965, 1967, 1971, 1972, 1973, 1974, 1975, 1976, 1977, 1981, 1985, 1987
Portfolio : 1963, 1965, 1969, 1971, 1972, 1973, 1974, 1977, 1980, 1981, 1985, 1986, 1989
Thickness team : 1963, 1965, 1967, 1970, 1973, 1975, 1977, 1982, 1983, 1984, 1985
Team composition : 1963, 1965, 1969, 1977, 1985, 1987

Riding
Equestrians won 17 titles.
Dressage single ladies: 1964
Show jumping ladies: 1954, 1959, 1960, 1966, 1968
Show jumping men: 1964, 1965
Eventing men: 1954, 1959, 1960, 1963, 1967, 1968, 1970, 1971, 1972

Rowing
Rowers won 133 titles, in one of the world bests league.
Single scull men: 1950, 1951, 1961, 1969, 1982, 1984
Single scull ladies: 1979, 1980, 1983, 1987, 1989
Single scull; Double men: 1960, 1962, 1970, 1971, 1975, 1976,  1978, 1984, 1989
Coxed four (4+)  men: 1962, 1966, 1971, 1973, 1980, 1981, 1983, 1984, 1985, 1986, 1987, 1988, 1989, 1990
Quad (4x) (4-) men: 1958, 1962, 1964, 1976, 1980
Eight (8+) men: 1963, 1964, 1970, 1971, 1973, 1974, 1975, 1978, 1979, 1980, 1986, 1987, 1988
Eight (8+) ladies: 1953, 1957, 1965, 1966, 1968, 1973, 1974, 1975, 1976, 1978, 1986, 1987, 1988
Coxless pairs men: 1960, 1962, 1970, 1971, 1976, 1978, 1980, 1984, 1989
Coxed pairs ladies: 1954, 1962, 1965, 1966, 1967, 1968, 1972, 1973, 1977, 1981, 1983, 1985, 1986, 1987, 1988, 1989, 1990
Coxless pairs ladies: 1976, 1980, 1985, 1988, 1989
Coxed pairs men: 1961, 1970, 1982, 1986, 1988, 1989, 1990
Coxed four (4+) ladies: 1953, 1954, 1954, 1964, 1965, 1966, 1967, 1968, 1969, 1963, 1974, 1975, 1976, 1978, 1979, 1981, 1982, 1983, 1986, 1987, 1987, 1988, 1989, 1990
Coxless fours (4-) ladies: 1990
Double (2x) men: 1956, 1962, 1974, 1977, 1978, 1979, 1980, 1981, 1989, 1990

Rhythmic gymnastics
The athletes in rhythmic gymnastics won 1 title
Without device: 1971

Sailing
The sailors won 5 titles.
Gentlemen (pirate-class): 1963, 1966
Ladies (pirate-class): 1984
15-qm-Jolle cruiser: 1970, 1984

Shooting sports 
Men and women shooters won 124 titles.
Free .22 Long Rifle-can, 3x40 shot, : 1969, 1977, 1988
Free .22 long rifle-can, firinglying to 40,: 1960
Free .22 long rifle-can, 40 firingkneeling,: 1960, 1966, 1969, 1970
Free .22 long rifle-can, firingstanding for 40: 1969
Free .22 long rifle-can, 3x20 shot: 1973
Free .22 long rifle-can, 3x40 shot, crew: 1964 1969
Free .22 long rifle-can, 40 firingkneeling, crew: 1969 1970
Free .22 long rifle-can, firingstanding for 40, crew: 1964
Free .22 long rifle-can, firinglying to 60, crew: 1963, 1964, 1969, 1970
Free .22 long rifle-can, firingstanding for 40, crew: 1964
Free rifle, 3x40 shot: 1974
Free rifle, firinglying to 40: 1961, 1963, 1967, 1968, 1969, 1970, 1971
Free rifle, 40 firingkneeling: 1966, 1967, 1968
Free rifle, 3x40 shot, crew: 1963, 1964, 1970
.22 long rifle-standard rifle, 3x 20 shot: 1969, 1973
.22 long rifle-standard rifle, 3x 20 shot, crew: 1969
Army rifle, 3x20 shot: 1955, 1957, 1958
Army rifle, 3x20 shot, crew: 1955, 1956, 1963, 1974
Free pistol, 60 shot: 1955, 1956, 1961, 1965
Free pistol, 60 shot, crew: 1958, 1960, 1964, 1969
.22 Long Rifle-machine pistol, 60 shot, /Olympic high-speed fires: 1959, 1967, 1969, 1970, 1971, 1979, 1987
.22 Long Rifle-machine pistol, 60 shot, crew: 1959, 1963, 1965
Large caliber pistol (gun), 60 shot: 1956, 1957, 1960, 1961, 1965, 1967, 1970, 1974
Large caliber pistol (gun), 60 shot, crew: 1956, 1958, 1959, 1960, 1961, 1962, 1963, 1964, 1965, 1967, 1968, 1969, 1970
Throw-pigeon-shoot, Trap: 1967, 1971, 1972, 1973, 1974, 1979, 1980, 1982, 1983, 1984, 1985, 1986, 1987, 1988
Throw-pigeon-shoot, Skeet: 1979 1986
Air rifle, firingstanding for 40: 1965, 1966, 1978, 1979, 1980, 1989

Shooting sports ladies
The shooting ladies won 22 titles.
.22 long standard can, 3x20 shot: 1955
.22 long standard can, firinglying to 30: 1960, 1961, 1963
.22 long standard can standard, firinglying for 60: 1960, 1963
.22 long standard rifle, 3x 20 shots: 1972, 1977, 1988, 1989
.22 long standard rifle, 3x 20 shots team: 1983
.22 long standard rifle, 60 shots: 1972, 1975, 1977, 1978, 1979,
air rifle, 60 shots: 1975, 1981, 1990
air gun: 1971, 1972, 1973

Ski alpin
The skiers won 22 titles.
downhill ladies: 1956, 1961, 1962
Slalom skiing ladies: 1961, 1962
Giant slalom skiing ladies: 1957, 1958, 1959, 1961, 1962
Alpine skiing combined ladies: 1956, 1957, 1958, 1958, 1959, 1961, 1962
Downhill gentlemen: 1961
Giant slalom skiing gentlemen: 1959, 1970, 1973
Alpine skiing combined gentlemen: 1962

Ski Nordic / nordic combined
The Dynamo-Athletes won in ski Nordic 23 titles.
Nordic combined gentlemen: 1956, 1957, 1958, 1959, 1960, 1961, 1962, 1963, 1965, 1967, 1968, 1970, 1974, 1981, 1983, 1984, 1985, 1986
Nordic combined ladies: 1970, 1986, 1987, 1988, 1989

Ski jumping
16 titles won the ski jumpers. 
special jump gentlemen: 1956, 1958
normal ski jumping hill gentlemen: 1968, 1982, 1983, 1984, 1987
big ski jumping hill gentlemen: 1966, 1977, 1980, 1981, 1982, 1987, 1988
ski jumping hill team: 1967, 1987

Skittles (sport)
The skittlers won 2 titles.
Sektion Board- Gentlemen: 1979, 1990

Soccer
Football teams won 18 titles and 15 won in a row. 
Men: 1953, 1971, 1973, 1976, 1977, 1978, 1979, 1980, 1981, 1982, 1983, 1984, 1985, 1986, 1987, 1988, 1989, 1990

Speedskating
Speedskaters won 121 titles.
Team pursuit gentlemen: 1954, 1955, 1957, 1958, 1960, 1962, 1963, 1965, 1968, 1970, 1978, 1983
Team pursuit ladies: 1957, 1958, 1960, 1961, 1962, 1963, 1964, 1965, 1966, 1966, 1967, 1968, 1970, 1975, 1978
Team pursuit sprint gentlemen: 1984, 1986
Team pursuit sprint ladies: 1973, 1974, 1975, 1979
Single distance 500m ladies: 1964, 1965, 1967, 1968, 1968, 1969, 1970, 1971, 1972, 1976, 1979
Single distance 1000m ladies: 1964, 1965, 1966, 1967, 1968, 1969, 1970, 1971, 1972, 1979, 1989
Single distance 1500m ladies: 1964, 1965, 1966, 1967, 1968, 1969, 1970, 1971, 1972, 1979, 1980
Single distance 3000m ladies: 1964, 1965, 1966, 1967, 1968, 1969, 1970, 1971, 1972, 1980, 1984
Single distance 500m gentlemen: 1964, 1965, 1970, 1971, 1972, 1983, 1984, 1986, 1987, 1989
Single distance 1000m gentlemen: 1980, 1983, 1984, 1985, 1986, 1987, 1988, 1989
Single distance 1500m gentlemen: 1964, 1965, 1968, 1971, 1980, 1984, 1985, 1986, 1987, 1988, 1989
Single distance 5000m gentlemen: 1965, 1967, 1968, 1970, 1971, 1972, 1980
Single distance 10000m gentlemen: 1964, 1965, 1966, 1967, 1968, 1969, 1970, 1971, 1972

Swimming ladies
76 titles won the swimming ladies.
50m freestyle: 1983, 1985, 1987, 1988, 1989, 1990
100m freestyle: 1977, 1978, 1979, 1981, 1983, 1989, 1990
200m freestyle: 1972, 1973, 1977, 1978, 1979, 1980, 1981, 1982, 1989, 1990
400m freestyle: 1972, 1973, 1976
4 × 100m freestyle relay: 1975, 1976, 1977, 1978, 1979, 1982, 1983, 1984, 1985, 1987, 1988, 1989
4 × 200m freestyle relay: 1985, 1986, 1987, 1989, 1990
100m breaststroke: 1967, 1969, 1976, 1985
200m breaststroke: 1958, 1976, 1990
4 × 200m breaststroke relay: 1959
100m butterfly: 1972, 1977, 1978, 1979, 1980
100m butterfly: 1972, 1977, 1978, 1979, 1980
200m medley: 1972, 1973, 1974, 1975, 1976, 1978, 1980
400m medley: 1970, 1972, 1988
4 × 100m medley: 1976, 1977, 1978, 1979, 1990

Swimming men
98 titles won the swimmers.
50m freestyle: 1982, 1983, 1985, 1986, 1990
100m freestyle: 1979, 1980, 1981, 1982, 1983, 1984 1985, 1986, 1987, 1988, 1990
200m freestyle: 1970, 1977, 1979, 1980, 1981, 1983, 1984, 1985, 1986, 1987, 1990
400m freestyle: 1976, 1977, 1979, 1982, 1983, 1984
1500m freestyle: 1961, 1968, 1974, 1977, 1982, 1984, 1986
100m breast: 1973, 1985, 1986, 1987, 1988
200m breast: 1964, 1973, 1975, 1981, 1983, 1984, 1985, 1986, 1987, 1988, 1990
4 × 100m relay freestyle: 1973, 1979, 1980, 1981, 1982, 1983, 1984, 1985, 1986, 1987, 1988, 1989, 1990
4 × 200m relay freestyle: 1970, 1977, 1978, 1979, 1980, 1981, 1982, 1983, 1958, 1986, 1987, 1988
100m butterfly: 1982, 1983
200m butterfly: 1989
200m backstroke: 1976, 1977
100m lagen: 1987, 1988, 1989, 1990
400m lagen: 1976
4 × 100m medley: 1970, 1973, 1984, 1985, 1987, 1989, 1990

Volleyball
Volleyball teams won 25 titles.
Ladies: 1962, 1963, 1964, 1965, 1966, 1968, 1969, 1972, 1973, 1974, 1975, 1978, 1979, 1985, 1986, 1986, 1987, 1988, 1989, 1990
Gentlemen: 1961, 1978, 1979, 1980, 1990

Water polo
Water polo teams won 17 titles.
League: 1958, 1959, 1960, 1961, 1962, 1963, 1964, 1965, 1966, 1967, 1968, 1969, 1970, 1971, 1972, 1973, 1977

Weightlifting
Weightlifters won 9 titles.
Flyweight three-event/two-event gentlemen: 1969, 1971
Flyweight press gentlemen: 1969, 1971
Flyweight snatch gentlemen: 1969
Flyweight strike gentlemen: 1969, 1971
Middleweight three-event/two-event gentlemen:1953
Club: 1971

Wrestling
The wrestler won 168 titles.
Half Flyweight (Freestyle wrestling): 1975, 1977, 1978, 1979, 1981, 1985, 1986
Flyweight (Freestyle wrestling): 1981, 1983, 1984, 1985, 1986
Bantamweight (Freestyle wrestling): 1968, 1969, 1970, 1972, 1974, 1975, 1978, 1982
Featherweight (Freestyle wrestling): 1972, 1973, 1975, 1977, 1986, 1987
Lightweight (Freestyle wrestling): 1968, 1970, 1971, 1972, 1973, 1974, 1986, 1988
Welterweight (Freestyle wrestling): 1971, 1972, 1973, 1974, 1975, 1977, 1977, 1979, 1981, 1982, 1983, 1986, 1988
Middleweight (Freestyle wrestling): 1954, 1962, 1968, 1969, 1972, 1973, 1974, 1975, 1976, 1978, 1983, 1985, 1986, 1987
Light heavyweight (Freestyle wrestling): 1970, 1976, 1988
Heavyweight (Freestyle wrestling): 1962, 1963, 1966, 1974, 1975, 1976, 1977, 1978, 1979, 1980, 1981, 1981, 1982, 1983, 1984, 1987
Super Heavyweight (Freestyle wrestling): 1969, 1970, 1974, 1975, 1976, 1977, 1978, 1978, 1979, 1980
Team (Freestyle wrestling): 1972, 1973, 1974, 1976, 1977, 1980, 1987
Half Flyweight (Greco-Roman wrestling): 1969, 1973, 1974, 1975, 1979,
Flyweight (Greco-Roman wrestling): 1966, 1968, 1970, 1971, 1972, 1974, 1976, 1977, 1982
Bantamweight (Greco-Roman wrestling): 1968, 1969, 1971, 1975, 1982, 1985
Featherweight (Greco-Roman wrestling): 1970, 1973, 1974, 1975, 1976, 1977, 1978, 1988
Lightweight (Greco-Roman wrestling): 1964, 1965, 1966, 1968,
Welterweight (Greco-Roman wrestling): 1969, 1970, 1971, 1972, 1975, 1980, 1987, 1988,
Middleweight (Greco-Roman wrestling): 1969, 1980, 1981, 1982
Half heavyweight (Greco-Roman wrestling): 1969, 1970, 1972, 1974, 1975,
Heavyweight (Greco-Roman wrestling): 1958, 1962, 1963, 1964, 1965, 1967, 1979, 1981, 1987, 1988
Super Heavyweight (Greco-Roman wrestling): 1969, 1985, 1986, 1987, 1988
Team (Greco-Roman wrestling): 1968, 1970, 1971, 1972, 1973, 1976, 1984

See also 
 List of Dynamo sports society athletes
 List of international winning SV Dynamo sports club athletes

References 

SV Dynamo
SV Dynamo
East Germany sport-related lists